The Austin Cemetery, is a  cemetery whose first known burials were in 1863 in Austin, Nevada, United States. It was listed on the National Register of Historic Places in 2003.

History 
It consists of four cemetery sections: Masonic and Odd Fellows sections on the north of U.S. 50, and Calvary (Catholic) and "Citizens" sections on the south side. A fifth section, for Indians, next to the Citizen's section, is not included in the NRHP listing, due to owner issues.

Notable burials
 Loreta Janeta Velázquez (1842 –), putative Confederate Army soldier, spy and author

See also 

 National Register of Historic Places listings in Lander County, Nevada
 List of cemeteries in Nevada

References

External links
 

1863 establishments in Nevada
Cemeteries on the National Register of Historic Places in Nevada
National Register of Historic Places in Lander County, Nevada
Austin, Nevada
Odd Fellows cemeteries in the United States